John Talbott Donoghue (1853 – July 1, 1903) was an American artist who was born in Chicago.  Although he produced figural sculpture, bas reliefs and paintings, his fame rests primarily on a single bronze sculpture, "The Young Sophocles".  This bronze was originally cast in 1885, but later castings are known to exist.  It is a full-length nude sculpture of the Greek dramatist Sophocles playing a lyre while leading the chorus of victory after the Battle of Salamis in 480 BCE.  John Talbott Donoghue shot himself on July 1, 1903, in Lake Whitney, Connecticut.

The Honolulu Museum of Art and the Metropolitan Museum of Art are among the public collections holding works by John Talbott Donoghue.  The latter’s The Young Sophocles Leading the Chorus of Victory after the Battle of Salamis is on long-term loan to the Federal Reserve Bank of New York.

During his 1882 lecture tour of North America Oscar Wilde met Donoghue and encouraged Chicagoans to support one "whose work is beautiful — more beautiful than the work of any sculptor I have seen yet, and of whom you should all be proud." His work was also part of the sculpture event in the art competition at the 1928 Summer Olympics.

References

 Hartmann, Sadakichi & Jane Calhoun Weaver, Sadakichi Hartmann: Critical Modernist: Collected Art Writings, University of California Press, 1991, p. 308 ff

1853 births
1903 suicides
19th-century American painters
American male painters
19th-century American sculptors
19th-century American male artists
American male sculptors
Olympic competitors in art competitions
Suicides by firearm in Connecticut